Ragasudha or  Raagasudha is an Indian actress who predominantly works in Tamil and Kannada film industries, she also acted in few Malayalam and Telugu  movies as well.

Personal life
Ragasudha is the daughter of Malayalam actress K. R. Savithri and sister of actress Anusha. Actresses K. R. Vijaya and K. R. Vatsala are her aunts. She lives in Chennai with her family. Ragasudha got married with actor Ranjith in 2014 at Thiruvenkadu Temple, Sirkazhi., however within a year they have got divorced in 2015.

Film career
Ragasudha made her debut in Tamil movie Thangathin Thangam which was released in 1990.

Filmography
This list is incomplete; you can help by expanding it.

Tamil

 Thangathin Thangam (1990) ... Latha/Muthaayi
 Government Mappillai (1992) ... Chellayi
 Jallikattu Kaalai (1994)
 Thamizhachi (1995)
 Sivasakthi (1996) ... Vandana
 Abhimanyu (1997) ... Deraviyam's wife
 Nerrukku Ner (1997) ... Maya
 Dhinamum Ennai Gavani (1997) ... Geetha
 Chinna Durai (1999)
 Kadhalar Dhinam (1999)
 Rojavanam (1999)
 Angala Parameswari (2001)
 Kamarasu (2002)
 Kadhal Virus (2002)
 Thaaye Bhuvaneshwari (2004) ... Mohini
 Iyer IPS (2005) ... Parameshwari
 Thambi (2006)
 Ammuvagiya Naan (2007) ... Malli

Kannada

 Krishnarjuna (2000)
 Asthra (2000)
 Deepavali (2000)
 Amma Nagamma (2001)
 Grama Devathe (2001)
 Mafia (2001)
 Mysore Huli (2001)
 Dharma Devathe (2002)
 Vijaya Dashami (2003)

Malayalam
 Arangu (1991) ... Neelima
 Bhoomika (1991) ... Raji
 Sravu (2001) ... Devu
 Jagathy Jagadeesh in Town (2002) ... Rekha
 Vasanthamalika (2003) ... Anna

Telugu
 Sundara Vadana Subbalakshmi Moguda (1994)
 Peddamma Talli (2004) ... Mohini

TV Series
 Ketti Melam (Jaya TV) - Tamil
 Dracula  (Asianet) - Malayalam

References

External links

Actresses in Kannada cinema
Actresses in Tamil cinema
Living people
Actresses in Telugu cinema
Actresses in Malayalam cinema
Indian film actresses
Tamil actresses
Actresses in Tamil television
Actresses in Malayalam television
20th-century Indian actresses
21st-century Indian actresses
Female models from Tamil Nadu
Year of birth missing (living people)